Victor Jörgen Nilsson Lindelöf (born 17 July 1994) is a Swedish professional footballer who plays as a defender for  club Manchester United and captains the Sweden national team. Mainly a centre-back, he can also play as a right-back and a defensive midfielder.

Lindelöf began his career in Sweden at Västerås SK, making his debut in October 2009. In December 2011, he agreed to move to Benfica in Portugal, initially representing the club at youth and B levels. After making his first-team debut in September 2013, he continued to appear for the club at B level, while also winning three Primeira Liga titles. He joined Manchester United in July 2017.

Lindelöf has represented Sweden at under-17, under-19, under-21, and senior levels. He was inside the winning squad of the 2015 UEFA European Under-21 Championship. He made his senior international debut in March 2016 and represented his country at UEFA Euro 2016, the 2018 FIFA World Cup and UEFA Euro 2020.

Club career

Early career
Lindelöf played for numerous Västerås-based clubs in his youth such as IK Franke, Västerås IK and Västerås SK.

Västerås SK
In October 2009, at the age of 15, Lindelöf made his first-team debut for Västerås SK, when the team beat BK Forward 3–0 in the last round of the 2009 Division 1 Norra season. In the following season, he helped his team advance a step higher in the Swedish league system, as they were promoted to the second highest league. In 2011, he travelled to England to have a trial with Stoke City, but they did not make an offer for him.

Benfica

On 1 December 2011, Lindelöf agreed to join Portuguese club Benfica in the summer of 2012, and on 8 June 2015, the contract was extended until 2020. In the 2012–13 season, he played for the youth team and won the Portuguese under-19 championship. On 19 October 2013, he debuted for the first-team in a 1–0 Portuguese Cup win against CD Cinfães, playing the full match. In the 2013–14 season, he scored 2 goals in 33 matches for the reserve team.

In the 2015–16 season, he returned to the first-team in a 1–0 win against Nacional in the Taça da Liga. On 16 February 2016, he played the entire match for Benfica in a 1–0 home win against Zenit Saint Petersburg in the first leg of UEFA Champions League's round of 16. Four days later, he scored his first goal for Benfica, in a 3–1 Primeira Liga victory at Paços de Ferreira. On 28 May 2017, he played in the Taça de Portugal final, which Benfica won over Vitória de Guimarães (2–1). By the time he was leaving Benfica he had won three Primeira Liga titles, two Taça de Portugal titles and one Taça da Liga title.

Manchester United

2017–18 season

On 10 June 2017, Manchester United announced that they had agreed a deal with Benfica to sign Lindelöf for a fee of €35 million (with a potential €10 million in add-ons), pending the agreement of personal terms and the player passing a medical. Lindelöf passed his medical at the Trafford Training Centre on 14 June, with the Swede signing a four-year contract with the option of an extra year; Manchester United announced that the contract would begin on 1 July.

He made his official debut for the club against Real Madrid in the 2017 UEFA Super Cup; however, it was more than two months before his Premier League debut, brought on during added time against Liverpool on 14 October. He was limited to just 17 premier league matches, starting 13 of them, due to Jose Mourinho's preference of playing a defensive partnership of Chris Smalling and Phil Jones.

2018–19 season
In the 2018–19 season, Lindelöf became Mourinho's preferred centre-back and was playing more often than he did in the previous season. He played the full 90 minutes in the first match of the season on 11 August 2019 against Leicester City, which ended in a 2–1 home win. He further went on to start in 11 out of 13 league matches before Jose Mourinho was sacked in December 2018 and replaced with Ole Gunnar Solskjær. Lindelöf scored his first goal for Manchester United on 29 January 2019, scoring their second goal in a 2–2 league draw at home to Burnley.

2019–20 season
In September 2019, Lindelöf signed a new contract until 2024, with the option of a further year. On 1 December 2019, he played 90 minutes and scored his only goal in the season in a league match against Aston Villa that ended 2–2 draw. He ended the season making 35 appearances and scoring one goal in the league, the third most in league appearances within the club that season coming behind Harry Maguire and David de Gea who both played all 38 matches, forming a defensive partnership with Maguire in the process.

2020–21 season
On 20 December 2020, Lindelöf scored his first goal of the 2020–21 season in a 6–2 home win against Leeds United. He played the full 90 minutes on 2 February 2021 in Manchester United's Premier League record-equalling 9–0 home win against Southampton. On 26 May 2021, he played the full 120 minutes as Manchester United lost in the 2021 UEFA Europa League final to Villarreal after a 10–11 penalty shoot-out in which Lindelöf scored United's 10th penalty kick.

International career

Youth team
Lindelöf made his debut for the under-21 team on 14 October 2014, in the second leg of the qualification play-offs against France.

Although Lindelöf was not named in the final squad for the UEFA European Under-21 Championship, on 15 June 2015 he replaced defender Emil Krafth who was ruled out of the tournament after a back injury. He made his debut in the tournament in the first game against Italy. On 30 June 2015 he successfully converted Sweden's fifth and last penalty against Portugal in a 4–3 penalty shoot-out victory in the final to become European under-21 champion. He was named in the Team of the Tournament.

Senior team

Debut 

Lindelöf received his first call up to the senior Sweden squad in March 2016 for friendlies against Turkey and Czech Republic. He debuted for the country in a 2–1 away loss to Turkey on 24 March 2016.

UEFA Euro 2016 
He was selected in Sweden's squad for UEFA Euro 2016 in France, where he started all three of their group games, although Sweden failed to progress to the round of 16. Lindelöf was also selected in Sweden's 35-man provisional squad for the 2016 Summer Olympics in Rio de Janeiro, but was prevented from participating in the tournament by his club Benfica, who believed that the involvement of their players in the Olympics would harm their chances for the following season.

2018 FIFA World Cup 
Lindelöf scored his first international goal for Sweden in a 3–0 win over Bulgaria in a 2018 FIFA World Cup qualifier at Friends Arena in Stockholm on 10 October 2016.

In May 2018, he was named in Sweden's 23-man squad for the FIFA World Cup in Russia. Lindelöf missed the first game against South Korea due to illness, but was a regular starter in defense alongside fellow centre-back Andreas Granqvist for the remainder of the tournament. Lindelöf and Sweden were eliminated in the quarter final against England.

UEFA Euro 2020 
In March 2019, Lindelöf was called up for Sweden's UEFA Euro 2020 qualifying matches against Romania and Norway. However, he chose to withdraw from the squad, citing personal reasons, namely the birth of his first child. He was replaced by Anton Tinnerholm.

He represented Sweden at UEFA Euro 2020, and appeared in all four games as Sweden reached the round of 16 before being eliminated by Ukraine.

On 11 August 2021, Lindelöf was named Andreas Granqvist's successor as captain by Sweden coach Janne Andersson following Granqvist's retirement after Euro 2020.

Personal life
Following his move to Manchester United in 2017, Lindelöf announced his engagement to his long-time girlfriend Maja Nilsson. They got married at the end of May 2018, in Sweden. In March 2019, their first child was born. Their second child was born in October 2021. 

While in his home city in August 2020, Lindelöf witnessed the robbery of a 90-year-old woman by a man on a bike; Lindelöf chased the thief on foot and managed to catch him, holding him until the police arrived. The police later thanked Lindelöf for his "quick and wise intervention".

In January 2022, while Lindelöf was playing the full 90 minutes against Brentford in a 3–1 win, his Manchester home was broken into by intruders whilst he was on the pitch. His wife and two children were at home but hid and were left unharmed.

Career statistics

Club

International

As of match played 19 November 2022. Sweden score listed first, score column indicates score after each Lindelöf goal.

Honours
Västerås SK
Division 1 Norra: 2010

Benfica
Primeira Liga: 2013–14, 2015–16, 2016–17
Taça de Portugal: 2013–14, 2016–17
Taça da Liga: 2015–16
Supertaça Cândido de Oliveira: 2016

Manchester United
EFL Cup: 2022–23
UEFA Europa League runner-up: 2020–21

Sweden U21
UEFA European Under-21 Championship: 2015

Individual
UEFA European Under-21 Championship Team of the Tournament: 2015
Fotbollsgalan Best Defender: 2016, 2019
UEFA Champions League Breakthrough XI: 2016
SJPF Primeira Liga Team of the Year: 2016
Guldbollen: 2018, 2019

References

External links

Profile at the Manchester United F.C. website
 (archive)
 (archive)

1994 births
Living people
Sportspeople from Västerås
Swedish footballers
Sweden youth international footballers
Sweden under-21 international footballers
Sweden international footballers
Association football defenders
Västerås SK Fotboll players
S.L. Benfica B players
S.L. Benfica footballers
Manchester United F.C. players
Ettan Fotboll players
Superettan players
Liga Portugal 2 players
Primeira Liga players
Premier League players
UEFA Euro 2016 players
2018 FIFA World Cup players
UEFA Euro 2020 players
Swedish expatriate footballers
Expatriate footballers in England
Expatriate footballers in Portugal
Swedish expatriate sportspeople in England
Swedish expatriate sportspeople in Portugal